Kulushats is a rural locality (a selo) and the administrative centre of Kulushatsky Selsoviet, Laksky District, Republic of Dagestan, Russia. The population was 63 as of 2010. There are 3 streets.

Geography 
Kulushats is located 8 km southwest of Kumukh (the district's administrative centre) by road. Chitur and Shovkra are the nearest rural localities.

Nationalities 
Laks live there.

Famous residents 
 Rizvan Suleymanov (Hero of the Soviet Union)
 Nuratdin Yusupov (poet)

References 

Rural localities in Laksky District